Once Long Ago: Folk & Fairy Tales of the World is a book of 70 fairy tales from many countries and cultures. The tales are told by Roger Lancelyn Green and illustrated by Vojtěch Kubašta. The book was published in 1962 by Golden Pleasure Books in London and reprinted in 1966 (second edition) and 1967 (third edition). It is out of print.

The book is notable for the wide variety of its tales, most of which will be unfamiliar to readers from English-speaking countries, such as "The Nung-Guama" (Chinese), "The Voice of Death" (Romanian), and "Long, Stout, and Sharpeyes" (Czech). More familiar tales include "Little Snow White" and "The Sleeping Beauty."

Contents 

All wording and spelling appears as in the original book.

Related works 

A stripped-down version of the book, titled Once Upon a Time: Folk and Fairy Tales of World, was also published containing only 35 of the tales and their illustrations.

References

Collections of fairy tales